Lusail Plaza Towers or Lusail Plaza Complex is set of four  office towers on the Al Sa'ad Plaza, Commercial Boulevard, Lusail, Qatar. It was begun in 2020 and will be completed in Octover 2023 (core and shell+ lobby finishings)  The 1.1 million-square-metre development is host the headquarters for the Qatar National Bank, Qatar Central Bank and Qatar Investment Authority alongside several other global organisations including Qatari Diar. Lusail Plaza Towers was designed by Foster & Partners.

References 

Lusail
Skyscrapers in Qatar
Skyscraper office buildings
Office buildings completed in 2022